Port Sultan Qaboos (previously known as Mina Qaboos) is the largest port in Muscat, Oman. Developed initially as a part of a plan for a "Greater Muttrah" by Qaboos bin Said al Said's predecessor, Said bin Taimur, the port's construction was completed in the 1970s.  The port is operated and managed by Port Services Corporation S.A.O.G.

The Ministry of Transport and Communications announced that , the port would cease commercial operations, preceding its transformation into a cruise ship port.  Cargo operations are shifting to Sohar Industrial Port in Sohar.  The government has cited congested road traffic in Muscat as a reason for the move.

Port Sultan Qaboos is the home port of the Oman Royal Yacht Squadron.

See also
 Old Muscat

References

External links
 Port Sultan Qaboos on World Port Source website

1974 establishments in Oman
Geography of Muscat, Oman
Economy of Muscat, Oman
Transport in Muscat, Oman
Ports and harbours of Oman